Apisai Smith is a Fijian footballer who plays as a striker.

References 

Living people
1983 births
Fijian footballers
Fiji international footballers
Fijian people of I-Taukei Fijian descent
Fijian people of British descent
Suva F.C. players
Navua F.C. players
Rewa F.C. players
Lautoka F.C. players
2012 OFC Nations Cup players
Association football forwards